Mohamad Najib bin Haji Tarif is a Bruneian footballer who plays as a midfielder or left-sided full-back for DPMM FC and the Brunei national team.

Club career
Starting out with the likes of NBT FC and AM Gunners of the Brunei Premier League, Najib's performances at the 2012 Hassanal Bolkiah Trophy as team captain prompted a move from MS PDB to Brunei's only professional club, DPMM.

After appearing only seven times in the 2015 season, Najib's club head coach Steve Kean advised him to switch to the left-back position for him to gain playing time (as he has done to Helmi Zambin and Aminuddin Zakwan Tahir). A season-ending injury to first-choice Sairol Sahari meant that he would be relied on much more heavily in 2016.

Najib became the starting left-back for DPMM's 2017 campaign which ended in a disappointing 8th place, leading to the dismissal of coach Steve Kean. He was back on the sidelines  with the arrival of Suhaimi Anak Sulau in the following season.

Najib regained his place at the start of the 2019 campaign under Adrian Pennock. He was rotated with Abdul Mu'iz Sisa for the position on the left of Pennock's 3-5-2 formation, becoming the starter towards the second half of the season. He became Singapore Premier League champion with DPMM by September of that year.

Despite playing in the occasional advanced left-sided role for DPMM, Najib's first league goal for the club did not come until 4 July 2021 when he scored one of the 15 unanswered goals against Rimba Star FC in the Brunei Super League.

In 2022, DPMM competed domestically at the 2022 Brunei FA Cup, managing to advance to the final of the competition with Najib appearing regularly at the left side of the lineup. On 4 December, DPMM overcame Kasuka FC 2–1 in the final, handing them their second ever Brunei FA Cup trophy.

International career

Najib has played for Brunei Under-21 since 2005, and is the only player to have played in 4 Hassanal Bolkiah tournaments, winning the trophy in 2012. He regards his injury-time free-kick  against Cambodia in that year's opening match as the best goal he has ever scored.

Najib scored in Brunei Under-23's first match against Timor-Leste at the 2011 SEA Games football tournament, but the team lost 1–2. He then played in all five matches as Brunei finished fifth in their group.

Najib's full international debut for the Wasps came in the 2008 AFC Challenge Cup qualification held in the Philippines where he played in all three games. He was also ever-present for Brunei's AFF Suzuki Cup qualifying campaigns in 2012 and 2014. For the 2016 edition he was deployed at left-back, but did not finish the game due to injury which would keep him out of the rest of the games.

Najib was in the list for the 2016 AFC Solidarity Cup but initially did not travel with the rest of the squad. Nevertheless, he recovered and made the starting lineup for the opening match, and kept his place at left-back for the whole tournament as Brunei finished in fourth place.

Najib linked up with the Brunei national team for the two-legged 2018 AFF Suzuki Cup qualifying matches against Timor-Leste in early September 2018. He started the first leg at left-back in a 3–1 loss on 1 September in Kuala Lumpur. He kept his place in a more advanced role on the return leg at Hassanal Bolkiah National Stadium a week later and scored the only goal of the game. His winning goal gave Brunei their first ever home win for an international game, but the scoreline was not enough to qualify for the Suzuki Cup competition proper.

In June 2019, Najib was due to link up with the national team for the 2022 World Cup qualification matches against Mongolia, but pulled himself out of contention.

Najib played in three friendly games for Brunei in 2022, against Malaysia away in May and against both the Maldives and Laos home in October. He also played in both matches of the 2022 AFF Mitsubishi Electric Cup qualifying against Timor-Leste, where the Wasps prevailed 6–3 on aggregate to qualify for the regional tournament for the first time in 26 years. In the group stage, he played twice against powerhouses Thailand and Indonesia, both resulting in losses for Brunei.

International goals
Scores and results list Brunei's goal tally first.

Honours

Team

DPMM FC
 S.League: 2015
 Singapore Premier League: 2019
 Singapore League Cup (2): 2012, 2014
 Brunei FA Cup: 2022

International
Hassanal Bolkiah Trophy: 2012

Individual
 
  Meritorius Service Medal (PJK) (2012)

Personal life
Najib has nine siblings, one of which is Na'im Tarif who plays for MS PPDB.

References

External links

Living people
Association football midfielders
Bruneian footballers
Brunei international footballers
DPMM FC players
1988 births
Competitors at the 2011 Southeast Asian Games
Southeast Asian Games competitors for Brunei